Deni Hočko (born 22 April 1994) is a Montenegrin professional footballer who plays as a central midfielder for Cypriot club Pafos and the Montenegro national football team.

Club career

Budućnost
Hočko was born in Cetinje, Montenegro. He joined Budućnost from his hometown club Lovćen in 2013. In his first season at the club, Budućnost fielded the youngest team in the entire Montenegrin First League that season. One teammate at Budućnost belonging to Hočko's generation was Momčilo Raspopović, who was also born in 1994. They both ended up playing together in Montenegro's national team from 2019.

Famalicão
On 21 July 2017, Hočko signed a two-year contract with Portuguese club Famalicão. In his second season at the club, Famalicão finished in second place in the 2018–19 LigaPro, earning promotion to Portugal's Primeira Liga for the first time since the 1993–94 season.

Mouscron
On 28 June 2019, Hočko signed a three-year contract with Belgian club Royal Excel Mouscron.

Pafos
On 14 July 2021, he moved to Pafos in Cyprus for an undisclosed fee.

International career
On 28 May 2018, Hočko made his debut for Montenegro under coach Ljubiša Tumbaković in a 0–0 tie with Bosnia and Herzegovina.

References

External links

 

1994 births
Sportspeople from Cetinje
Living people
Montenegrin footballers
Montenegro youth international footballers
Montenegro under-21 international footballers
Montenegro international footballers
Association football midfielders
FK Lovćen players
FK Budućnost Podgorica players
F.C. Famalicão players
Royal Excel Mouscron players
Pafos FC players
Montenegrin First League players
Liga Portugal 2 players
Belgian Pro League players
Cypriot First Division players
Montenegrin expatriate footballers
Montenegrin expatriate sportspeople in Portugal
Expatriate footballers in Portugal
Montenegrin expatriate sportspeople in Belgium
Expatriate footballers in Belgium
Montenegrin expatriate sportspeople in Cyprus
Expatriate footballers in Cyprus